The badminton mixed doubles tournament at the 2006 Asian Games in Doha took place from 6 December to 8 December at Aspire Hall 3.

Schedule
All times are Arabia Standard Time (UTC+03:00)

Results

Final

Top half

Bottom half

References 
Official Website
Asian Games Complete Results

Badminton at the 2006 Asian Games